Wazir is a 2016 Indian Hindi-language neo-noir action thriller film directed by Bejoy Nambiar and produced by Vidhu Vinod Chopra. Written and edited by Abhijat Joshi and Chopra, the film stars Farhan Akhtar and Amitabh Bachchan alongside Aditi Rao Hydari, Manav Kaul and Neil Nitin Mukesh. John Abraham makes a special appearance. The film's dialogue and additional dialogue were written by Abhijeet Deshpande and Gazal Dhaliwal, respectively. The music was composed by several artists including Shantanu Moitra, Ankit Tiwari, Advaita, Prashant Pillai, Rochak Kohli and Gaurav Godkhindi, with the background score composed by Rohit Kulkarni. Sanu Varghese served as the film's cinematographer.

Based on an original story by Chopra, Wazir follows the story of a suspended Anti-Terrorism Squad officer who befriends a chess player who is a wheelchair user. The idea of the film came to Chopra in the 1990s and he started writing it in English with Joshi over a period of four years starting in 2000. It was supposed to be Chopra's first Hollywood film, with Dustin Hoffman playing the protagonist. However, its producer died and the film was shelved for nearly eight years. Chopra and Joshi later re-wrote the script so it could be produced as a Hindi film. Principal photography began on 28 September 2014.

Wazir opened on 8 January 2016 to mixed to positive reviews from critics who particularly praised the action sequences and the performances of both Bachchan and Akhtar, but criticised the predictable nature of the film. The film performed well at the box office, with approximate worldwide revenues of ₹78.69 crore (US$12 million).

Plot 
Anti-Terrorism Squad officer Danish Ali (Farhan Akhtar) lives with his wife Ruhana (Aditi Rao Hydari) and little daughter Noorie. One day, while Danish is driving with his wife and daughter, he spots the terrorist Farooq Rameez and chases him. Noorie is killed in the ensuing shootout while Rameez escapes. Ruhana is shattered and blames Danish for Noorie's death. Danish later kills Rameez during a police operation, angering his seniors, who wanted Rameez alive to find out which politician he was going to meet. Subsequently, Danish is suspended from the ATS.

A grief-stricken Danish is about to kill himself at Noorie's grave when a mysterious van appears, driving off when Danish yells at it. Danish finds a wallet lying where the van was, goes to return it, and meets its owner, a handicapped chess master named Pandit Omkar Nath Dhar (Amitabh Bachchan), who turns out to have been Noorie's chess teacher. Pandit starts teaching Danish chess and tells him about Nina, Pandit's daughter who also died. Nina (Vaidehi Parashurami) had been teaching chess to Ruhi (Mazel Vyas), the daughter of a government minister, Yazaad Qureshi (Manav Kaul), and had fallen down the stairs at Qureshi's house and died. Pandit is convinced that her death was not an accident. Puzzled and intrigued, Danish tries to meet Qureshi, but cops at the minister's office threaten him with arrest. Danish later meets Ruhi at her school to ask her about Nina, but Ruhi is taken away by Qureshi who threatens her for talking to Danish. That night Pandit is brutally attacked by Wazir (Neil Nitin Mukesh), a hitman sent by Qureshi, who warns Pandit and Danish to stop chasing Qureshi.

Pandit leaves for Kashmir, where Qureshi is headed. Wazir calls Danish and threatens to kill Pandit right there. Danish frantically chases Pandit's van, but Wazir blows it up, killing Pandit. Determined to exact revenge and discover who Wazir is, Danish leaves for Kashmir without informing Ruhana and makes a plan with the Superintendent of Police Vijay Malik (John Abraham) to pull Wazir out. During Qureshi's speech, Malik detonates explosives hidden in a chandelier above the podium, causing a panic, and holds back the police to give Danish time to act. Qureshi escapes in the confusion and goes to where he and Ruhi are staying, but Danish breaks in and asks him about Wazir. Qureshi claims he does not know anybody called Wazir, when a crying Ruhi reveals to Danish that Qureshi is not her father – he is actually one of the militants who massacred her entire village and posed as her father when Indian Army troops arrived. Ruhi had told Nina this, so Qureshi killed Nina and staged it as an accident. Danish realises that Rameez and the other terrorists had come to meet Qureshi, and kills him. Subsequently, the ATS and Ruhi reveal to the media that Qureshi was actually a terrorist.

A few days later, while watching Ruhana's play – based on chess and dedicated to Pandit – Danish realises that Pandit was in fact the play's "weak pawn" who befriended a "strong rook" (Danish) who would kill a "wicked king" (Qureshi) to wreak revenge. Shocked by this epiphany, Danish finds Pandit's housekeeper, who says that she did not actually see Wazir on the night he attacked Pandit, but remembers an instruction about a USB pen-drive which Pandit had told her to give to Danish if he came looking for Wazir at all. The pen-drive contains a video of Pandit, who explains that Wazir never existed – he was just a persona created by Pandit, who knew that, due to his handicap, he was powerless against Qureshi, who he wanted dead. Pandit intentionally dropped his wallet near Noorie's grave so Danish could find it and befriend him. His knife wounds from Wazir's attack were self-inflicted, and he had used voice recordings to pose as Wazir on the phone. Pandit had sacrificed himself to ensure that Danish would kill Qureshi and get revenge for both of them. Shaken by the revelation, Danish and Ruhana reunite.

Cast 
 Farhan Akhtar as Daanish Ali, Ruhana's husband
 Amitabh Bachchan as Pandit Omkar Nath Dhar, Daanish's friend, and Nina's father
 Aditi Rao Hydari as Ruhana Ali, Daanish's wife
 Manav Kaul as Yazaad Qureshi
 Neil Nitin Mukesh as Wazir
 John Abraham as SP  Vijay Mallik (special appearance)
 Nasirr Khan as Rameez
 Prakash Belawadi as Deputy commissioner of police
 Vaidehi Parashurami as Nina Dhar, Daughter of Pandit Omkar Nath Dhar
 Anjum Sharma as Sartaj Singh, Daanish's colleague
 Murali Sharma as Mahesh
 Nishigandha Wad as Ruhana's mother
 Seema Bhargava as Pammi, the Pandit's housekeeper
 Avtar Gill as G.B. Singh, police commissioner
 Mazel Vyas as Ruhi
 Gargi Patel as Ruhi's minder
 Reem Shaikh (special appearance)

Production

Development 

The idea of Wazir came to Vidhu Vinod Chopra after badminton player Syed Modi was murdered on 28 July 1988 in Lucknow. However, Chopra has said that the film is completely different from the incident. When Chopra met his eventual co-writer Abhijat Joshi in 1994, he told him about the idea of setting a thriller around two chess players. Chopra described the two characters as "Rakesh Maria and Viswanathan Anand playing chess". The script was later written by them in four years, between 2000 and 2004. It was supposed to be Chopra's first Hollywood film, with Dustin Hoffman playing the protagonist. In 2005, their producer Robert Newmyer suddenly died and the script was shelved.

Chopra saw Bejoy Nambiar's 2013 film, David; he was particularly impressed by the black-and-white portions of it. Chopra subsequently called Nambiar and expressed a desire to work with the director; Chopra had a cache of unfilmed scripts, and Nambiar selected the chess one. Chopra and Joshi then spent two years writing a Hindi version of it.

Both Chopra and Joshi consulted chess experts from America for the film. The cinematography of the film was done by Sanu Varghese, who had previously worked with Nambiar on David. The film's story was tweaked constantly during its seven-month editing period; both writers also served as editors. This was the first time since his 1989 picture Parinda that Chopra had edited a film. Joshi, who edited for the first time on Wazir, believes that "a film is rewritten on the editing table". Visual effects were used to hide Bachchan's legs, to make them look as if they ended below the knees. The makers of the film went through 40 to 50 wheelchairs to find one that would be comfortable for Bachchan over the long shoot. The working titles of the film were Do and Ek Aur Ek Do, and it received its final title, Wazir, in October 2014, based on the character of that name in the film.

Casting 
At the screening of Lakshya (2004), Chopra informed Farhan Akhtar about the script of Wazir, and wanted his feedback on it. Ten years later, in 2014, they met again, and Akhtar agreed to do the film because, as he later said, the revised script "moved me to my core". He went through intense training and put on eight kilograms of weight to play the role of an Anti Terrorist Squad officer. He also changed his diet and met some of his friends who were ATS officers for the preparation. He modeled his character in the film on Vishwas Nangare Patil, an Inspector-general of police from Kolhapur, Maharashtra. Akhtar agreeing for the role puzzled Chopra, who recalls: "At that time, Javed Akhtar (Farhan's father) and I were engaged in a public verbal duel. When I asked Farhan what made him agree to take up the role, he said, 'The script is so good that I will bear with you. Chopra noted that while re-writing the film in Hindi, he and Joshi "realised the protagonist can't be American. We had to bring in our own sensibilities. Our cinema is more flamboyant. So the protagonist needed to be flamboyant too. We thought of making the chess master an Indian and approached [Amitabh] Bachchan for it". Bachchan had read the original script, and remembered it when Chopra came to him. Aditi Rao Hydari was cast after Nambiar saw her pictures when she had walked the ramp for a designer and Chopra saw her dancing. After this, she went through three set of auditions: dance, acting and a screen test. John Abraham and Neil Nitin Mukesh make extended cameo appearances in the film.

Filming 
Principal photography commenced on 28 September 2014 in Mumbai. Parts of the film were also shot in Delhi. Chopra claims that "some of the best lines in Wazir are improvised" on the set, including a joke about the Russian vodka and Russian girls between Bachchan and Akhtar. Akhtar did his own stunts in the film. He completed his schedule in March 2015 at Srinagar, while Bachchan filmed his remaining scenes the following month.

Visual effects 
Amitabh Bachchan's legs were removed below the knee in the film with the use of visual effects to show him handicapped. He wore black socks with marks on them during filming to aid in the eventual creation of the effects. Chopra was not happy with the initial effects work on the legs, so he had changes made to improve the results.

Soundtrack 

The film's soundtrack album was composed by a number of artists: Shantanu Moitra, Ankit Tiwari, Advaita, Prashant Pillai, Rochak Kohli and Gaurav Godkhindi. The background score was composed by Rohit Kulkarni while the lyrics were penned by Vidhu Vinod Chopra, Swanand Kirkire, A. M. Turaz, Manoj Muntashir and Abhijeet Deshpande. The album rights of the film were acquired by T-Series, and it was released on 18 December 2015. "Tere Bin", the first single track, was released individually on 4 December 2015, two weeks prior to the album. The video focuses on Farhan Akhtar and Aditi Rao Hydari; the song is sung by Sonu Nigam and Shreya Ghoshal and composed by Shantanu Moitra, with lyrics penned by Chopra. The next two single tracks were released at one-week intervals after the first: "Tu Mere Pass", the second single track, was composed and sung by Ankit Tiwari with lyrics by Manoj Muntashir, and the third, "Maula Mere Maula", was composed by Moitra, sung by Javed Ali and written by Chopra and Swanand Kirkire; its release date of 18 December coincided with the album's release. Fusion rock band Advaita made their film debut with the song "Khel Khel Mein". The track "Tere Liye" was written by A. M. Turaz and composed by Prashant Pillai. It was sung by Gagan Baderiya and Pillai himself. The song "Atrangi Yaari", composed by Rochak Kohli, was sung by Bachchan and Akhtar. The theme track of the film was composed by Gaurav Godkhindi.

Critical response 
Joginder Tuteja of Bollywood Hungama wrote: "Wazir has a fair mix of songs that are situational and also that could find popularity over a period of time. Though one isn't quite hunting for any solid chartbusters here, the music does work well in the context of the film." R.M. Vijayakar of India-West summed up with, "In short, three decent songs and three eminently forgettable songs makes for a mixed listening experience. Take it or skip it." Aelina Kapoor from Rediff.com commented, "Wazir has good situational soundtracks that don't aim to set any records but go well with the theme of the film."

Release 
Wazir was initially set to be released in the middle of 2015, and the first teaser of the film was attached with PK (2014). Its planned release date was moved to 2 October and then further to 4 December, but it was ultimately released in India and worldwide on 8 January 2016. The film was given a "UA" certificate with no cuts by the Central Board of Film Certification. The first poster of the film was released on 15 November 2015 via Bachchan's and Akhtar's Twitter accounts, each unveiling the other's look from the film. The official trailer of the film was released on 18 November. Chopra showed the complete film to as many as 70 Indian film programmers and distributors.

In pre-release publicity, Nambiar said, "Casting Mr. Bachchan, who has got such a strong persona, and limiting him in a wheelchair, was a big task for us to get used to". This remark was condemned as "disparaging and extremely condescending" by Javed Abidi, the founder of the Disability Rights Group. Nambiar subsequently apologised for hurting anyone's feelings. The film was released on DVD on 25 March 2016 and is also available on Netflix.

Critical reception 
The Indian Express gave the film 2.5/5 stars and wrote: "watching Farhan Akhtar and Amitabh Bachchan joust and manoeuver around each other is this film's high point". Srijana Mitra Das of The Times of India gave it 3.5/5 stars and opened with, "So, Wazir is a smart movie – which could have been way smarter". Subhash K. Jha gave it 4/5 stars, highlighted its "deviously clever script" and added, "In its 1 hour and 40 minutes of playing-time Wazir gives us no time to stop and ruminate." Sweta Kaushal of Hindustan Times, in a 3/5 review, wrote that "apart from the smart storyline, powerful performances are the backbone of Wazir", and commended both the lead and supporting actors. Baradwaj Rangan characterized the film as "a decent relationship drama, a silly thriller". Shubhra Shetty Saha of Mid-Day praised Bachchan's "amazing emotional precision" and said his performance was "the best thing about this film". However, he also decried the film's "lack of subtlety" and ended with "Wazir is a good, one-time watch."

Many critics felt the film started well but failed to follow through. Ananya Bhattacharya of India Today felt that the film had a "taut, gripping narrative" until the interval but "stumble[d]" in its second half. According to Rajeev Masand of News18 in a 2.5/5 star review, the film was "a consistently watchable but frankly far-fetched thriller that just isn't as smart as it ought to have been". Namrata Joshi of The Hindu called the film "lacklustre": "Despite starting off promisingly with slick production values and good performances to boot Wazir unravels badly, especially in the second half as it heads towards the climax." Raja Sen of Rediff.com gave the film 2/5 stars and characterized it as "obvious"; he said that "none of the character motives in this film actually add up". Saibal Chatterjee from NDTV wrote that "Wazir puts all its crucial cards on the table far too quickly, robbing itself of the shock factor that would have made all the difference between edge-of-the-seat suspense and tame by-the-numbers thrills." Rachit Gupta of Filmfare, in a 3/5 star review, was also unhappy with the film's predictability: "If you pay enough attention to the first half, you'll instantly guess how the end will pan out. So you're sitting in a thriller knowing what's coming up." Gupta added that the climax was convenient and "inane".

Among overseas reviewers, The Guardians Mike McCahill gave the film three stars out of five, and described it as "a finely poised Bollywood policier". Abhinav Purohit of The National in Abu Dhabi also gave it three stars, and wrote that "overall, Wazir is sure to resonate well with the viewers".

Box office 
Wazir was the first Hindi film of the year. The film had a moderate opening at the overseas box office on its first day, and collected .

Domestic revenues increased for each of the next two days of the film's opening weekend. Daily international revenues declined as the weekend progressed, with total overseas collections rising to Rs  after two days, and  after three.

Wazir collected  in domestic revenues in its second weekend, eventually becoming the first hit of 2016 at the Hindi film box office.

References

External links 
 
 

2016 films
Films scored by Shantanu Moitra
2010s Hindi-language films
2016 action thriller films
2016 crime thriller films
Indian action thriller films
Indian crime thriller films
Indian detective films
Films shot in Mumbai
Films shot in Delhi
Reliance Entertainment films
Kashmir conflict in films
Films directed by Bejoy Nambiar